Roman Manukhov (born March 11, 1994) is a Russian professional ice hockey defenceman who is currently playing for Traktor Chelyabinsk of the Kontinental Hockey League (KHL). He is a one-time Russian Champion.

Awards and honours

References

External links

1994 births
Living people
Ak Bars Kazan players
Avangard Omsk players
Bars Kazan players
Lokomotiv Yaroslavl players
Metallurg Novokuznetsk players
HC Ryazan players
Traktor Chelyabinsk players
Sportspeople from Yekaterinburg